Zacary William Lowther (born April 30, 1996) is an American professional baseball pitcher in the Baltimore Orioles organization. He made his Major League Baseball (MLB) debut in 2021 for the Orioles.

Amateur career
Lowther attended Cuyahoga Heights High School in Cuyahoga Heights, Ohio, and played as a pitcher for their baseball team. He also started on the varsity football team for two seasons. In three years on the varsity team, Lowther had a 12–2 win–loss record, a 0.71 earned run average (ERA), and 201 strikeouts. He enrolled at Xavier University and played college baseball for the Xavier Musketeers. He led the Big East Conference with 86 strikeouts in 2016, his sophomore year. That summer, he played collegiate summer baseball for the Brewster Whitecaps of the Cape Cod Baseball League, where he was named a league all-star and led the league with 54 strikeouts. In 2017, Lowther set a Xavier single-season record with 123 strikeouts and was named to the All-Big East Conference team.

Professional career
The Baltimore Orioles selected Lowther in the second round, with the 74th overall selection, of the 2017 MLB draft. He became the highest draft pick from Xavier's baseball program. Lowther signed with the Orioles, receiving a $779,500 signing bonus. He pitched for the Aberdeen IronBirds of the Class A-Short Season New York-Penn League after he signed, going 2–2 with a 1.66 ERA in 12 games (11 starts). He began the 2018 season with the Delmarva Shorebirds of the Class A South Atlantic League. In May, the Orioles promoted Lowther to the Frederick Keys of the Class A-Advanced Carolina League and he finished the season there. In 23 games (22 starts) between the two clubs, he pitched to an 8–4 record with a 2.18 ERA.

During the 2019 season, Lowther played for the Bowie Baysox of the Class AA Eastern League, going 13–7 with a 2.55 ERA over 26 starts, striking out 154 batters over 148 innings. Lowther did not play in a game in 2020 due to the cancellation of the Minor League Baseball season because of the COVID-19 pandemic. On November 20, 2020, Lowther was added to the 40-man roster.

Lowther began the 2021 season at the Orioles' alternate site in Bowie. On April 25, 2021, Lowther was promoted to the major leagues for the first time. He made his MLB debut that day against the Oakland Athletics, pitching a scoreless ninth inning. The next day, the Orioles optioned Lowther back to their alternate site. The Orioles assigned him to the Norfolk Tides of the Class AAA International League, and then promoted him to the major leagues for his first start on May 8; he allowed seven runs in two innings pitched. Lowther returned to Norfolk after the game, and was promoted back to the major leagues in June.

Lowther competed for a spot in the Orioles starting rotation in 2022, but began the season with Norfolk. Lowther made 1 appearance with the Orioles, pitching 5.1 innings with 5 earned runs, and was designated for assignment on June 15 following the claiming of Jonathan Araúz.

Personal life
Lowther's father, Marc, coached him from the time he was six years old through his career at Cuyahoga Heights. He and his wife, Brianna, have one daughter, born in January 2021.

References

External links

1996 births
Living people
Sportspeople from Cuyahoga County, Ohio
Baseball players from Ohio
Major League Baseball pitchers
Baltimore Orioles players
Xavier Musketeers baseball players
Brewster Whitecaps players
Aberdeen IronBirds players
Delmarva Shorebirds players
Frederick Keys players
Bowie Baysox players
Norfolk Tides players
Lakeshore Chinooks players